Andre Pärn (born 21 September 1977) is an Estonian former basketball player.

Andre Pärn started his basketball career in hometown Asto at the age of 16. Next season he moved to Estonian powerhouse Kalev until 2000. During the time, he won multiple national championships and cups. After six seasons with Kalev, Pärn moved to Swedish Plannja Basket where he played a successful season. The same summer he was a member of the Estonia national basketball team which played in the EuroBasket 2001 competition.

Following the tournament with Team Estonia, he had his last foreign spell in Belgium with Leuven Bears. His later achievements include another Estonian championship title in 2006 but also a silver medal from the 3on3 Street ball World Championship in Moscow, Russia.

Achievements
 Estonian Championship: 1993–94, 1994–95, 1995–96, 1997–98, 2005–06
 Streetball World Championships:
 Runner-up: 2010

External links
Profile at Basket.ee
Profile at BBL.net

1977 births
Living people
BC Kalev/Cramo players
BC Tallinn Kalev players
Estonian men's basketball players
Estonian expatriate basketball people in Belgium
Estonian expatriate basketball people in Sweden
Korvpalli Meistriliiga players
Leuven Bears players
Power forwards (basketball)
BC Rakvere Tarvas players
Rapla KK players
Basketball players from Tallinn